Stanaford Branch is a stream in the U.S. state of West Virginia.

Stanaford Branch most likely derives its name from the surname Stanford.

See also
List of rivers of West Virginia

References

Rivers of Raleigh County, West Virginia
Rivers of West Virginia